Shaun Simpson (born 13 March 1988) is a Scottish professional motocross racer. He has competed in the Motocross World Championships since 2004. Simpson has won two British motocross championships (2008 and 2014), a Belgian Championship (2011) and has represented Great Britain four times at the prestigious Motocross des Nations.

Motocross career
Simpson was born in Gauldry, Fife, Scotland and educated at Madras College secondary school. In 2010, Simpson competed for the KTM factory racing team managed by former world champion Stefan Everts in the F.I.M. MX2-GP World Championships. He finished in 8th place with three podium finishes. For 2011 he signed a contract to race for the Honda LS team and finished the season in fifteenth place. He raced in the 2013 season with Factory TM Ricci Racing using the number 24 jersey. Simpson announced his separation from TM Racing on 24 June 2013. He placed seventh in the 2014 MXGP world championship and, improved to a fourth-place finish in the 2015 season with three moto victories while riding for the HM Plant KTM UK team.

References

External links 
 Shaun Simpson homepage
 Shaun Simpson KTM profile

1988 births
Living people
British motocross riders
Sportspeople from Fife
People educated at Madras College